Chris De Witte (born 13 January 1978) is a Belgian former professional footballer who played as a forward. He represented R.S.C. Anderlecht in his native country, after which he went abroad to play for FC Twente and FC Groningen in the Netherlands.

Honours
FC Twente
 KNVB Cup: 2000–01

References

1978 births
Living people
Belgian footballers
Footballers from Antwerp
Association football forwards
R.S.C. Anderlecht players
FC Twente players
FC Groningen players
Belgian Pro League players
Eredivisie players
Belgian expatriate footballers
Expatriate footballers in the Netherlands
Belgian expatriate sportspeople in the Netherlands